Sandy is a market town and civil parish in Central Bedfordshire, England. The town has a population of around 13,400 based on 2015 estimates.

The A1 road bypasses the town to the west, with the East Coast Main Line running to the east. The area surrounding the town is dominated by a range of low hills known as the Sand Hills with the River Ivel running through the town.

The headquarters of the Royal Society for the Protection of Birds (RSPB) is on the outskirts of the town, having moved to The Lodge in 1961.

History 
An archaeological dig in May 2006 revealed that the area may have been settled earlier than 250 BC. However, Sandy was a Roman settlement and was probably an important trading centre and staging post in the Roman era. An ancient hill fort, now heavily wooded and traditionally known as Caesar's Camp, although more commonly called "the sand hills" or "the lookout", still overlooks the town.

Sandy is referred to in the Domesday Book, as Sandeia, a derivation from the Old English Sandieg, meaning a sand-island. In 1086 Sandy was listed in the Domesday Book as being held by Eudo Fitzhubert, who is likely to have been the tenant. He was probably also known as Eudo Dapifer, who was a high steward for William the Conqueror, and based in Colchester Castle.

In addition there were also two mills listed, and both of these would have been water-powered. There are still references to one of them in the road name Mill Lane which runs along the River Ivel. However the mill has since been replaced by housing. Further down the river from the site where the mill once stood is Sandye Place Academy where it is believed there was a Danish camp which was built to protect the Danelaw in 886. Evidence at the Riddy, a local nature reserve just south of Sandy, shows that mill-building has taken place on this site since at least the time of the Norman era, though the last mill was built here in 1857.

Sandy was part of Biggleswade Rural District between 1894 and 1927, and was then governed as Sandy Urban District between 1927 and 1974. When the urban district council was abolished in 1974 to become part of Mid Bedfordshire, a town council was established as a successor parish.

The town expanded rapidly in the 1970s with the development of London overspill housing between Sunderland Road and St Neots Road. This expansion continued into the 1990s with new housing developments at Fallow Field and Ivel Park.

Government 
Sandy is governed by two tiers of local government: the town council, and the Unitary Authority of Central Bedfordshire. It is within the Parliamentary constituency of North East Bedfordshire.

Geography

The River Ivel, a tributary of the River Great Ouse, runs through the town. Parts of the town and adjoining land are designated as a Flood Warning Area. The Greensand Ridge, an escarpment which runs through Buckinghamshire, Bedfordshire, and Cambridgeshire, runs to the south of the town.

The Sandy Heath transmitting station, a 244 metre tall television broadcast mast, is located to the east of the town.

Transport

Road
Sandy is situated on the A1 which hugs the western edge of the town. The A603 leads west towards Bedford; the B1042 leads east towards Potton and Cambridge.

The A1 bypass was one of the earlier 1950s improvements on the Great North Road. The bypass required a new bridge over the River Ivel, built by Dorman Long. The roundabout (former traffic lights before the late 1970s) is with the A603 for Bedford, to the west and the B1042 into Sandy itself and on to Potton and Cambridge. The former A603, to the east is now the B1042. The former north–south route through the town was over Girtford Bridge, to the west of the current route, and now the A603. There were three separate bypass schemes – the Improvement from Sandy to the junction with A428 (Tempsford and Tempsford Bridge Diversions, began December 1957, finished around 1960), Provision of second carriageway (widening) through Girtford (began 2 January 1961, finished around October 1962), and Biggleswade by-pass to Girtford (Girtford Diversion, which opened on 6 August 1961 which included pulverised fuel ash as an embankment infill material). The Girtford Underpass was built in the early 1990s by Kimbell Construction, at the former Varsity Line railway bridge.

Rail

Sandy railway station is located on the East Coast Main Line and provides half-hourly trains south to central London and beyond to Horsham, and north to Peterborough. Journey times to London are typically around 40 minutes. The station is managed and served by Thameslink and Great Northern.

Past and future rail links

The Varsity Line, which connected Oxford to Cambridge, ran through Sandy until 1967, stopping at Girtford Halt at the north end of the bypass. From Bedford to Sandy, the line has been paved over and is now part of the NCR 51 cycle route.

In January 2020, East West Rail Ltd, which exists to re-establish the OxfordCambridge rail link, announced a new route between Bedford and Cambridge that will bypass Sandy, with a new station 'in the Tempsford area'.

Bus
The no.73 Stagecoach East bus service, runs half-hourly Monday - Saturday between Biggleswade, Sandy and Bedford. No Sunday service.

Sport and leisure
Sandy has an amateur football team, Sandy F.C., who compete in Division One of the Bedfordshire County Football League.

An athletics track, located at Sandy Secondary School, is home to Biggleswade Athletic Club.

Education
Schools in Sandy were previously 3 tier (lower, middle and upper) as per the rest of the schools in Central Bedfordshire. However, from 2018 schools in the town have converted to being 2 tier (primary and secondary). Due to these changes Sandye Place Academy (the middle school in Sandy) closed in September 2019.

Primary schools
 Laburnum  Primary school
 Maple Tree Primary School
 Robert Peel Primary School
 St Swithun's CE Primary School

Secondary schools
 Sandy Secondary School

Twinned towns 
Sandy has been twinned with the town of Malaunay in France since 1982, as a result of which the Sandy Twinning Association was also established. The association has also recently developed links with the town of Skarszewy in Poland.

Commemoration
Frederick Thomas Bidlake is commemorated by a garden and monument, at Girtford Bridge. It was unveiled on 23 September 1934 as more than 4,000 watched W. P. Cook, president of the Anfield Bicycle Club and the Road Records Association, perform the unveiling ceremony. The rector of Sandy blessed the memorial. The garden is triangular with a wall of local stone on one side. In its centre, a stone reads: "This garden is dedicated to Frederick Thomas Bidlake, a great cyclist, a man of singular charm and character, an untiring worker for cyclists 1867–1933". A sundial in the centre of the garden is marked "He measured time". A facsimile milestone is engraved "F. T. B. Few have known this road as he. London 48 – York 148".

Girtford Bridge itself was built in 1780–82 to the designs of the Rutland architect John Wing (1728–1794) assisted by his son John Wing (1756–1826)

There is a statue of William Peel VC in the south transept of St Swithun's Church. Opposite the church across the High Street stands the Sir William Peel pub.

Council representation

A total of 13 ballots were rejected.

Thirty seven ballots were rejected.

Town council
The council is made up of 15 councillors representing 4 wards: Beeston Ward  (1 member), Fallowfield Ward (3 members), Ivel Ward (5 members) and Pinnacle Ward (6 members).

References

External links

 Sandy Community Website
 Sandy Town Council
 Sandy Twinning Association

 
Central Bedfordshire District
Civil parishes in Bedfordshire
Hill forts in Bedfordshire
Market towns in Bedfordshire
Towns in Bedfordshire